Louis Lucas was one of the early commercial wine grape growers in Santa Barbara County, considered a local pioneer in the field. He is currently co-owner of Lucas & Lewellen Vineyards.

Early years
Lucas was born in Fresno CA in 1940 and spent much of his youth growing up in Delano CA. where his family worked in the table grape business.  He graduated from the University of Notre Dame in 1963.

Career
In 1970 Lucas and partners formed Tepusquet Vineyards becoming one of the first commercial wine grape growers in Santa Barbara County. In the early seventies he partnered to form Edna Valley Vineyards and expanded Tepusquet to include vineyards in the Shandon region near Paso Robles.  In 1996 Lucas partnered with Judge Royce Lewellen to form Lucas & Lewellen Vineyards.  The company owns three vineyards in Santa Barbara County producing 24 grape varietals, operates a winery in Buellton, CA and two tasting rooms in Solvang, CA.

Notes

References

Graham, O and Case, S (1999). "Aged in Oak: The Story of the Santa Barbara Barbara County Wine Industry" "Santa Barbara County Vintner's Association and University of California, Santa Barbara"
Jervis, L (2007). "The Birth of World Class Wines", "Santa Maria Times"

External links
  Louis Lucas Biography on Lucas & Lewellen website
  Compilation of Articles on Lucas & Lewellen website

American winemakers
American viticulturists
Living people
1940 births
University of Notre Dame alumni
People from Fresno, California
People from Delano, California